Jamal Thiaré (born 31 March 1993) is a Senegalese professional footballer who plays as a striker for Ligue 2 club Le Havre.

External links
 

1993 births
Living people
Association football forwards
Senegalese footballers
Belgian Pro League players
Championnat National players
Championnat National 3 players
Championnat National 2 players
Ligue 2 players
R.S.C. Anderlecht players
R. Charleroi S.C. players
US Avranches players
Le Havre AC players
Senegalese expatriate footballers
Expatriate footballers in Belgium
Expatriate footballers in France

Senegalese expatriate sportspeople in Belgium
Senegalese expatriate sportspeople in France